Zelota is a genus of longhorn beetles of the subfamily Lamiinae, containing the following species:

 Zelota bryanti Breuning, 1938
 Zelota malaccensis Breuning, 1936
 Zelota spathomelina Gahan in Shelford, 1902
 Zelota sumatrana Breuning, 1938

References

Mesosini